James Jarvis (born London, 1970) is a British illustrator and toy designer, a pioneer of the soft vinyl designer toy revolution.

Beginning as a designer for the fashion company Silas, Jarvis now creates characters at his own company, Amos Toys, each character with its own personality and background world.

Education
Jarvis was educated at Dulwich College, London. After a foundation course at Chelsea College of Arts he went on to study illustration at the University of Brighton (1990–1993) and took a master's degree in illustration at the Royal College of Art (1993–1995).

Career
1994: freelance illustrator
1998: begins collaboration with London fashion company Silas, designing a moulded plastic toy, Martin
1999: more Silas toys, Evil Martin and Bubba Silas
2000: exhibition at PARCO Gallery, Tokyo, later at Nagoya, of 'World of Pain', an imaginary environment invented for Silas
2000: World of Pain comic launched
2000: new toy Tattoo-Me Keith, for Silas
2001: Lars World of Pain, for Silas
2002: Juvenile Delinquents characters for Sony Capsule Toy
2002: book James Jarvis Drawings published
2002: With Sofia Prantera and Russell Waterman (directors of Silas), sets up Amos Toys
2003: three sets of In-Crowd toys for Amos: Forever Sensible Motorcycle Club, Ages of Metal and Zombies
2003-2007: King Ken (ape icon), Vortigern's Machine, the Great Sage of Wisdom, Tales From Green Fuzz, Rusty, Wiggs, Yod's Micro Theatre of Dreams
August 2006: with Liberty of London, creates Vortigern's Machine and The Great Sage of Wisdom displays in the menswear department of Liberty's Regent Street, London, store
January 2007: exhibition at Festival International de la Bande Dessinee, Angoulême, France
March 2007: launches blogspot at jamesjarvis.blogspot.com: "An insight into artistic genius, or the rantings of a madman on the road to oblivion? You decide!"
April 2007: runs in Zürich Marathon
April 2011: Collaborated with Coca-Cola for their 125th Anniversary
February 2012: 'Fifty-Two Spheres' - solo Exhibition at Beach London Gallery, Shoreditch
June 2013: 'Objects in Space' - solo Exhibition at Beach London Gallery, Shoreditch
James Jarvis Drawings (Relax Book, Tokyo, 2002)
Vortigern's Machine and the Great Sage of Wisdom (Amos Novelties Ltd, 2006)
 Yodzine (Amos Novelties Ltd, 2007)
Selected Drawings (Amos Novelties Ltd, 2008)

References

1970 births
Living people
People educated at Dulwich College
Alumni of the University of Brighton
Alumni of the Royal College of Art
British illustrators